Miguel Ángel Gutiérrez Machado (26 March 1960 – 29 December 2020) was a Mexican politician from the National Action Party.

Biography
From 2000 to 2003 he served as Deputy of the LVIII Legislature of the Mexican Congress representing the fourth electoral district of Yucatán.

He died at age 60 from COVID-19, during the COVID-19 pandemic in Mexico.

References

1960 births
2020 deaths
Politicians from Yucatán (state)
National Action Party (Mexico) politicians
21st-century Mexican politicians
Deaths from the COVID-19 pandemic in Mexico
Members of the Chamber of Deputies (Mexico) for Yucatán